All Things Pass (literally "Gone, gone") is a 1981 television film directed by Paul Verhoeven. In Douglas Keesey's book on Verhoeven, he writes that the film is a coda to Verhoeven's previous film Soldier of Orange (1977).

Plot
It concerns several Dutch resistance fighters 35 years after World War II who have sworn revenge on a Dutch SS officer who shot their friend during the Netherlands' resistance to Nazi occupation. Upon finding the man, they discover that he is now paralysed and would suffer more to stay alive than be killed.

Cast
André van den Heuvel-Ab
Piet Römer-Gerben
Hidde Maas-Arie
Guus Oster-Ben
Jan Retèl-Cees
Jan Staal-Niels
Leontien Ceulemans-Tine
Andrea Domburg-Dorien
Lous Hensen-Lenie
Simone Kleinsma-Tourguide
Diane Lensink-Carrie
Riek Schagen- The wife of Niels 
Maarten Spanjer-Jogger

Release
Although the film was shot in 1979, the first broadcast took place 2 years later. The KRO aired the film on May 3, 1981.
According to screenwriter Gerard Soeteman, the reason for this was that it was decided to give priority to the feature film Spetters first. As a result, this film remained unedited for 2 years.

References

External links

1980 films
Dutch drama films
1970s Dutch-language films
Films directed by Paul Verhoeven
Dutch television films